Wu Hongbo (born May 1952 in Shandong) is a Chinese diplomat. Until July 2017 he was the Under-Secretary-General in the United Nations Department of Economic and Social Affairs.
He replaced Sha Zukang as the head of DESA. 
 
Wu held various high-ranking positions and collected extensive experience in diplomacy. He has worked as Assistant Foreign Minister and Chinese Ambassador to Germany prior to this appointment. He has also worked in a number of locations including Hong Kong, Macao, and Manila.

He graduated from Beijing Foreign Studies University and also studied at Victoria University of Wellington.

Controversy about impartiality
In 2018, Wu told a studio audience that while he was an "international civil servant", who by the UN Charter are not allowed to take orders from their own country's government, that rule had exceptions, saying: "When it comes to Chinese national sovereignty and security, we will undoubtedly defend our country’s interests." As an example, he cited an incident where on his behest, Dolkun Isa, president of the World Uyghur Congress, was expelled from a United Nations Office where Isa was attempting to speak about the situation of Uyghurs in China.

References

External links

 http://www.newstrackindia.com/newsdetails/2012/06/01/323-Chinese-diplomat-competent-in-UN-job-FM-spokesman.html,
 http://www.china-botschaft.de/det/dshd/t804180.htm

Living people
Diplomats of the People's Republic of China
Chinese officials of the United Nations
Ambassadors of China to Germany
1952 births
People from Tai'an